The title of "Best in Show" is given to the dog chosen as the winner of the Westminster Kennel Club Dog Show according to conformation show rules. It has its origins in the variety classes for champions that were introduced in 1905 which included prizes for best champion dog and best champion bitch. The title of Best in Show at Westminster has been awarded every year beginning in 1907 except for 1923 when changes in American Kennel Club rules prohibited mixed breed judging until a uniform process could be adopted; following further changes in rules it was awarded again in 1924.

The Westminster Kennel Club Dog Show is an all-breeds conformation show. It has been held in New York City, New York annually since 1877. It was held at Madison Square Garden for the first time in 1880, and is currently held in the modern arena of the same name. Dogs are first placed in breed specific classes for Best of Breed, with the winners moving on to the respective breed group. Winners from each group then compete for the title of Best in Show. In each class, the individual dogs are judged against the breed standard of each dog breed.

In 1992, competition at Westminster was restricted to champions only. A dog can only become a champion by gaining championship points at other conformation shows. Prior to 1992, admission to dogs was open, and in 1938 an English Setter named Daro of Maridor was the Best in Show title at Westminster in his very first outing at a dog show at the age of 11 months. In 1929, a previously unregistered British dog won at Westminster using the name Laund Loyalty of Bellhaven, aged nine months in his only show on American soil.

The James Mortimer Memorial Silver Trophy is awarded permanently should the dog win Best in Show on five separate occasions with the same owner, otherwise a silver-plated replica is awarded. As of 2020, the most successful dog to win Best in Show at Westminster was a Smooth Fox Terrier named Ch. Warren Remedy. She was the first winner of Best in Show and the only dog to have won it on three occasions.

The Terrier Group would continue to win until 1913 when a Bulldog, Ch. Strathtay Prince Albert, won the title. The Terrier Group is the most successful group, with 45 wins out of 103 occasions. The least successful group is the Herding Group, a group which was only comparatively recently created in 1983, with wins by German Shepherd Dogs, in 1987 and 2017.

Best in Show

Summary of Best in Show winners

Number of winners by breed

Number of winners by group

See also 

 List of Best in Show winners of Crufts
 List of individual dogs

Notes

References

General

Specific

Best in Show winners of the Westminster Kennel Club Dog Show
Dog shows and showing

Westminster Kennel Club Dog Show
Awards to animals